Manuela De Iuliis (born 23 March 1991) is an Italian professional racing cyclist, who last rode for UCI Women's Team .

See also
 List of 2016 UCI Women's Teams and riders

References

External links
 

1991 births
Living people
Italian female cyclists
People from Castel di Sangro
Sportspeople from the Province of L'Aquila
Cyclists from Abruzzo